The 2019 Colonial Athletic Association men's soccer season was the 37th season of men's varsity soccer in the conference. The regular season began on August 30, 2019 and concluded on November 2, 2019.

The regular season culminated with the 2019 CAA Men's Soccer Tournament, which will began on November 8 and concluded on November 16, 2019.

UNCW won the CAA regular season championship, while James Madison won the CAA Tournament championship. James Madison earned the CAA's lone berth into the NCAA Tournament, where they were eliminated in the opening round.

Background 
The 2018 season began in August 2018 and concluded in November 2018. The regular season and tournament champions were James Madison, who finished the season with a conference record of 5–1–0 and a regular season and conference tournament record of 12–4–3. As 2018 CAA Men's Soccer Tournament champions, James Madison earned the conference's automatic bid into the 2018 NCAA Division I Men's Soccer Tournament. In addition to James Madison, UNCW earned an at-large berth into the NCAA Tournament. UNCW finished the regular season in second place and reached the semifinals of the CAA Tournament.

In the NCAA Tournament, both James Madison and UNCW entered in the first round. UNCW ultimately lost in the first round at home to Furman on penalty kicks, while James Madison reached the quarterfinals of the tournament, the best performance in program history. The Dukes defeated No. 16 High Point, No. 4 North Carolina, and No. 9 Virginia Tech – all on the road. In the quarterfinals, the Dukes played at No. 5 Michigan State. In the Elite Eight matchup, James Madison scored the opening goal in the 32nd minute from follow up shot by Niclas Mohr. The Dukes held the lead against the Spartans until the 72nd minute, where Ryan Sierakowski notched the match-tying goal through a lower-right corner shot. Sierakowski scored the go-ahead goal for Michigan State in the 81st minute, giving Michigan State their first College Cup berth since 1968, and preventing James Madison from reaching the College Cup.

Preseason

Preseason poll 
The preseason poll was released on August 22, 2019.

Preseason national polls 
The preseason national polls were released in July and August 2019.

Regular season

Early season tournaments

Conference results

Positions by round

CAA Players of the Week

Postseason

CAA Tournament

NCAA Tournament 

The NCAA Tournament will begin in November 2019 and conclude on December 17, 2019.

Rankings

National rankings

Regional rankings - USC Atlantic Region 

The United Soccer Coaches Atlantic Region compares teams across the Atlantic Sun Conference, Colonial Athletic Association, and Patriot League.

Awards and honors

Preseason honors 
The preseason honors were announced on August 22, 2019.

Postseason honors

Regional honors

All-Americans

To earn "consensus" status, a player must win honors based on a point system computed from the four different all-America teams. The point system consists of three points for first team, two points for second team and one point for third team. No honorable mention or fourth team or lower are used in the computation. The top five totals plus ties are first team and the next five plus ties are second team.

2020 MLS Draft

The 2020 MLS SuperDraft will be held in January 2020.

Total picks by school

List of selections

Homegrown players 

The Homegrown Player Rule is a Major League Soccer program that allows MLS teams to sign local players from their own development academies directly to MLS first team rosters. Before the creation of the rule in 2008, every player entering Major League Soccer had to be assigned through one of the existing MLS player allocation processes, such as the MLS SuperDraft.

To place a player on its homegrown player list, making him eligible to sign as a homegrown player, players must have resided in that club's home territory and participated in the club's youth development system for at least one year. Players can play college soccer and still be eligible to sign a homegrown contract.

No CAA players signed a homegrown contract ahead of the 2020 Major League Soccer season.

Notes

References

External links 
 CAA Men's Soccer

 
2019 NCAA Division I men's soccer season